The 2013–14 UCI America Tour was the tenth season for the UCI America Tour. The season began on 6 October 2013 with the Tobago Cycling Classic and ended on 25 December 2014 with the Vuelta a Costa Rica.

The points leader, based on the cumulative results of previous races, wears the UCI America Tour cycling jersey. Janier Acevedo from Colombia is the defending champion of the 2012–13 UCI America Tour.

Throughout the season, points are awarded to the top finishers of stages within stage races and the final general classification standings of each of the stages races and one-day events. The quality and complexity of a race also determines how many points are awarded to the top finishers, the higher the UCI rating of a race, the more points are awarded.

The UCI ratings from highest to lowest are as follows:
 Multi-day events: 2.HC, 2.1 and 2.2
 One-day events: 1.HC, 1.1 and 1.2

Events

2013

2014

External links

UCI America Tour
2014 in road cycling
2013 in road cycling
UCI
UCI
UCI
UCI